Kia Ghadami (born 26 January 1991) is an Iranian weightlifter who won the bronze medal in the Men's 105 kg weight class at the 2013 Asian Weightlifting Championships.

Major results

References

External links 
 
 

1991 births
Living people
Iranian male weightlifters
Iranian strength athletes
Universiade medalists in weightlifting
Universiade bronze medalists for Iran
Medalists at the 2017 Summer Universiade
20th-century Iranian people
21st-century Iranian people